K. P. Tripathi (born 10 August 1979) is an Indian politician, who represents the Semariya constituency in the Madhya Pradesh Legislative Assembly. He is a member of Bharatiya Janta Party.

Early life and education 
He was born on 10 Aug. 1979 at Hardi village of Semariya region. He completed his B.Sc. in 1998 from Model Science College, in Rewa and his LLB from Thakur Ranmat Singh College, Rewa.

Political career 
He became a member of the Madhya Pradesh Legislative Assembly by winning the Semariya seat in the 2018 Madhya Pradesh Legislative Assembly election.

References 

Madhya Pradesh MLAs 2018–2023
Living people
1979 births
People from Rewa district
Bharatiya Janata Party politicians from Madhya Pradesh